Effendi or effendy (originally from  ) is a title of nobility meaning sir, lord or master, especially in the Ottoman Empire and the Caucasus. The title itself and its other forms are originally derived from Medieval Greek aphentēs which is derived from Ancient Greek authentēs meaning lord.

It is a title of respect or courtesy, equivalent to the English Sir. It was used in the Ottoman Empire and Byzantine Empire. It follows the personal name, when it is used, and is generally given to members of the learned professions and to government officials who have high ranks, such as bey or pasha. The possessive form efendim (my master) was formerly used by slaves, and is commonplace in formal discourse, when answering the telephone, and can substitute for "excuse me" in some situations (e.g. asking someone to repeat something).

In the Ottoman era, the most common title affixed to a personal name after that of agha was efendi. Such a title would have indicated an "educated gentleman", hence by implication a graduate of a secular state school, even though at least some if not most of these efendis had once been religious students, or even religious teachers.

Lucy Mary Jane Garnett wrote in the 1904 work Turkish Life in Town and Country that Ottoman Christians, women, mullahs, sheiks, and princes of the Ottoman royal family could become effendi, a title carrying "the same significance as the French Monsieur" and which was one of two "merely conventional designations as indefinite as our 'Esquire' has come to be [in the United Kingdom]".

The Republican Turkish authorities abolished the title circa the 1930s.

Etymology
The Ottoman Turkish word , in modern Turkish , is a borrowing of the Medieval Greek  , from Byzantine Greek  , from Ancient Greek  , "master, author, doer, perpetrator" (cf. authentic). This word was widely used as a Greek title for Byzantine nobles as late as 1465, such as in the letters of Cardinal Bessarion concerning the children of Thomas Paleologus.

Other uses

 Effendi was also considered a title for a man of high education or social standing in an eastern (Mediterranean or Middle Eastern) country. It was an analogous to esquire, and junior to bey in Egypt during the period of the Muhammad Ali dynasty, and was used a lot among the Egyptians.
Effendi is still used as an honorific in Egypt, Jordan, and Turkey (as well as some other former Ottoman states), and is the source of the word أفندم؟ afandim?, a particularly polite way of saying, "Excuse me?", and can be used in answering the phone.
The colonial forces of British East Africa and German East Africa were built from a stock of Sudanese soldiers of the Egyptian army, which was nominally under the Ottoman Empire. These units entered East Africa with some officers who brought their title of effendi with them and, thus, it continued to be used for non-European officers of the two colonial forces. Up to the present the Swahili form afande is a way to address officers in the armies of Kenya, Tanzania and recently in Rwanda with the coming to power of RPF.
 Effendi (Governor's Commissioned Officer) was the highest rank that a Black African could achieve in the British King's African Rifles (KAR) until 1961 (from then, promotions to commissioned officers became possible). They were equivalent to the Viceroy's Commissioned Officers in the British Indian Army. An Effendi's authority was confined to other KAR troops (Askaris), and he could not command British troops. The KAR rank came into disuse during the 1930s and was reintroduced in 1956.
 Effendi was also a non-European's officer rank in the Schutztruppe of German East Africa. Similar to the above British practice, Effendis were promoted by a governor's warrant, not by a kaiser's commission, as white commissioned officers were. Effendis had no authority over white troops. In the Schutztruppe this rank was used, together with other ranks of Ottoman origin like "Tschausch" (sergeant) and "Ombascha" (corporal).
 In Bosnia and Herzegovina "Efendija" refers to Muslim clerics.
 In Indonesia and Malaysia, "Effendi" can be used as a first name.
 In Pakistan and India, "Effendi" is the surname of some families whose ancestors migrated from Turkey or Afghanistan.
 In Afghanistan, some members of the former ruling Barakzai clan of Durranis also use "Effendi" or a variant "Affandi" as their surname.
 In China, "Effendi" (阿凡提) often refers to Nasreddin.
 Jazz pianist McCoy Tyner has one composition named "Effendi". It appears on his debut album, Inception.
 Shoghi Effendi, born Shoghí Rabbání, acquired the title from ʻAbdu'l-Bahá in his youth.

See also
 Byzantine bureaucracy and aristocracy
 Ottoman titles
 Mustafa Sabri Efendi

Notes

References
Baranovitch, Nimrod.  "From the Margins to the Center." China Quarterly 175: 726-750 . Cambridge Univ. Press, 2003.
Drompp, Michael. Tang China And The Collapse Of The Uighur Empire: A History. Brill Academic Publishers, 2004.
 ReadLiterature.com - Definition of Efendi
 A Nation of Empire: The Ottoman Legacy of Turkish Modernity

Greek language
Ancient Greek
Ottoman titles
Titles in North Africa
Titles in Middle East
Titles in Pakistan
Titles in Lebanon
Titles in Bosnia and Herzegovina during Ottoman period